Damion Lee (born October 21, 1992) is an American professional basketball player for the Phoenix Suns of the National Basketball Association (NBA). He played college basketball for four years at Drexel University and transferred to Louisville for his final year of eligibility. After going undrafted in 2016, Lee played in the G League before signing with the Atlanta Hawks in March 2018. He then signed a two-way contract with the Golden State Warriors the following season, winning an NBA championship with the team in 2022.

High school career 

Lee graduated from Calvert Hall College High School in Towson, Maryland, where in his final season he was a Second-Team Baltimore Sun All-Metro and a First-Team All-Baltimore Catholic League selection. Lee attended prep school at St. Thomas More in Oakdale, Connecticut, where he averaged 17 points, 6 rebounds and 5 assists per game during the 2010–11 season. Lee was a First Team All-New England Preparatory School Athletic Council selection, leading his team to a 30–7 record and the National Prep School Championship.

College career

Drexel Dragons
In his freshman season as a member of the 2011–12 Drexel Dragons men's basketball team, Lee started at point guard. During that season, he averaged 12 points and 4.4 rebounds. After the impressive start to his college career, he was named the Colonial Athletic Association (CAA) Rookie of the Year. He was also named to the CAA All-Tournament team after averaging more than 15 points in Drexel's three tournament games. In the CAA championship game, the Dragons (25–5) lost to Virginia Commonwealth University, 59–56. VCU was a Final Four team the previous year, and the majority of projections had both teams making the NCAA tournament. However, a disappointing Selection Sunday saw the Dragons not invited to the NCAA Tournament and instead accepting an automatic bid to the 2012 National Invitation Tournament as the CAA regular season champion and #3 seed. The Dragons defeated the University of Central Florida and Northern Iowa, before falling to the University of Massachusetts in the regional final.

The following season, Lee was named to the Second-Team All-CAA after leading Drexel in scoring and finishing third in the CAA averaging 17.1 points per game. He was also second in the CAA in free throw percentage (82.9%), and fourth in three-pointers per game (2.3). In a game against Old Dominion, Lee recorded a career-high 34 points.

In his third season at Drexel, after being selected to the Preseason CAA All-Conference First Team, Lee suffered a torn ACL in a game against Arizona. This caused him to sit out the entire season and redshirt his junior year.

Before his redshirt junior season at Drexel, Lee was named to the Preseason CAA All-Conference First Team for the second year in a row. He also was named to the Charleston Classic All-Tournament team. On February 21, 2015, during a game against Northeastern, Lee suffered a fractured right hand which prematurely ended his season. Lee averaged 21.4 points per game during the season, ranking fourth in the nation and first in the CAA. His free throw percentage of 88.7% ranked 14th in the nation and second in the CAA. He also averaged 6.1 rebounds and 2.3 assists per game in 27 games. Furthermore, Lee also led the team in steals per game (1.5), field goal percentage (43.8%), and three-point percentage (38.5%%). At the conclusion of the regular season, Lee was one vote shy of winning CAA Player of the Year, losing to Senior William and Mary guard Marcus Thornton. However, Lee did win awards in CAA All-Conference First Team, CAA All-Defensive Team, and CAA All-Academic Team.

On March 30, 2015, Lee announced that he would be transferring out of Drexel University for his fifth and final collegiate season. He was considered to be the top transfer in college basketball by ESPN.

Louisville Cardinals
On April 23, 2015, Lee announced he would play his final collegiate season at Louisville under head coach Rick Pitino. Other schools Lee was considering included Arizona, Gonzaga, Marquette, and Maryland. Lee said after the move, "The U of L community itself was unreal. I don't think there's any other city or college basketball town like it." By mid-season in December 2015, he was Louisville's top point scorer. He was named to the 35-man midseason watchlist for the Naismith Trophy on February 11, 2016. On Senior Night, Lee passed the 2,000-point mark. With 10 games remaining in the season, Louisville ranked as the 13th best team in the country announced a self-imposed postseason ban for the 2015–16 season amid an ongoing NCAA investigation involving recruits between 2010 and 2014. They finished the regular season as the #16 ranked team with a 23–8 record, and did not play in the ACC Tournament or the NCAA Tournament because of the ban.

Professional career

Maine Red Claws (2016–2017)
After going undrafted in the 2016 NBA draft, Lee joined the Miami Heat for the 2016 NBA Summer League. On September 26, 2016, he signed with the Boston Celtics. He was later waived by the Celtics on October 20 after appearing in two preseason games. On October 31, he was acquired by the Maine Red Claws of the NBA Development League as an affiliate player of the Celtics. On January 10, 2017, he was waived by the Red Claws after suffering a season-ending injury. In 16 games, he averaged 17.8 points, 6.3 rebounds, 3.4 assists and 1.1 steals in 34 minutes.

Santa Cruz Warriors (2017–2018)
On August 24, 2017, Lee was traded to the Santa Cruz Warriors of the NBA G League.

Atlanta Hawks (2018)
On March 13, 2018, Lee signed a 10-day contract with the Atlanta Hawks. On March 23, the Atlanta Hawks signed Lee to a second 10-day contract. On April 2, the Atlanta Hawks signed Lee for the remainder of the season.

Golden State Warriors (2018–2022)
On July 14, 2018, Lee signed a two-way contract with the Golden State Warriors, which would lead him to return to the Santa Cruz Warriors.

On July 31, 2019, the Golden State Warriors re-signed with Lee on another two-way contract. On October 28, Lee recorded a double-double with a career-high 23 points, 11 rebounds and two assists in a 134–123 road victory over the New Orleans Pelicans. On December 25, Lee got his second double-double of the season with 22 points and a career-high 15 rebounds in a 116–104 win against the Houston Rockets. Lee picked up ample playing time due to a litany of injuries that befell the Warriors' roster (including a hand fracture in November that cost Lee 14 games) and burned through the 45-day allotment with the NBA team on his two-way contract. On January 15, 2020, the Golden State Warriors signed Lee to a multi-year contract.

On December 27, 2020, Lee put up 12 points, alongside a game-winning three-pointer, in a 129–128 win over the Chicago Bulls.

On June 16, 2022, Lee won the 2022 NBA Finals with the Warriors.

Phoenix Suns (2022–present) 
On July 7, 2022, Lee signed with the Phoenix Suns. On October 19, 2022, Lee made his Suns debut, putting up 11 points, two rebounds, two assists, and an off-balance, game-winning baseline jumper in a 107–105 win over the Dallas Mavericks. On January 13, 2023, Lee scored a career-high 31 points off the bench in a close 121-116 loss to the Minnesota Timberwolves.

National team career
On February 22, 2018, Lee was added to the United States national team for the 2019 FIBA Basketball World Cup qualification.

Career statistics

NBA

Regular season

|-
| style="text-align:left;"|
| style="text-align:left;"|Atlanta
| 15 || 11 || 26.9 || .408 || .250 || .759 || 4.7 || 1.9 || 1.3 || .1 || 10.7
|-
| style="text-align:left;"|
| style="text-align:left;"|Golden State
| 32 || 0 || 11.7 || .441 || .397 || .864 || 2.0 || .4 || .4 || .0 || 4.9
|-
| style="text-align:left;"|
| style="text-align:left;"|Golden State
| 49 || 36 || 29.0 || .417 || .356|| .873 || 4.9 || 2.7 || 1.0 || .1 || 12.7
|-
| style="text-align:left;"|
| style="text-align:left;"|Golden State
| 57 || 1 || 18.9 || .467 || .397 || .909 || 3.2 || 1.3 || .7 || .1 || 6.5
|-
| style="text-align:left;background:#afe6ba;"|†
| style="text-align:left;"|Golden State
| 63 || 5 || 19.9 || .441 || .337 || .880 || 3.2 || 1.0 || .6 || .1 || 7.4
|- class="sortbottom"
| style="text-align:center;" colspan="2"|Career
| 216 || 53 || 21.0 || .434 || .357 || .868 || 3.5 || 1.4 || .7 || .1 || 8.2

Playoffs

|-
| style="text-align:left;background:#afe6ba;"|2022†
| style="text-align:left;"| Golden State
| 16 || 0 || 7.8 || .382 || .250 || .667 || 1.6 || .4 || .1 || .0 || 2.0
|- class="sortbottom"
| style="text-align:center;" colspan="2"| Career
| 16 || 0 || 7.8 || .382 || .250 || .667 || 1.6 || .4 || .1 || .0 || 2.0

College

|-
| style="text-align:left;"|2011–12
| style="text-align:left;"|Drexel
| 36 || 35 || 28.9 || .454 || .375 || .773 || 4.4 || 1.7 || .8 || .3 || 12.0
|-
| style="text-align:left;"|2012–13
| style="text-align:left;"|Drexel
| 27 || 24 || 33.0 || .425 || .360 || .829 || 5.1 || 1.8 || .8 || .1 || 17.1
|-
| style="text-align:left;"|2013–14
| style="text-align:left;"|Drexel
| 5 || 5 || 26.8 || .370 || .273 || .864 || 4.2 || 2.2 || .6 || .2 || 13.0
|-
| style="text-align:left;"|2014–15
| style="text-align:left;"|Drexel
| 27 || 27 || 38.1 || .438 || .385 || .887 || 6.1 || 2.3 || 1.5 || .3 || 21.4
|-
| style="text-align:left;"|2015–16
| style="text-align:left;"|Louisville
| 30 || 30 || 33.6 || .428 || .341 || .843 || 3.9 || 2.0 || 1.5 || .0 || 15.9
|- class="sortbottom"
| style="text-align:center;" colspan="2"|Career
| 125 || 121 || 32.8 || .433 || .362 || .843 || 4.8 || 2.0 || 1.1 || .2 || 16.1

Personal life
Lee earned a degree in general humanities and social science at Drexel and majored in special education, with a concentration in assistive technology at Louisville.

Lee is married to Sydel Curry-Lee, who is the daughter of Dell Curry and younger sister of his former teammate Stephen Curry as well as Seth Curry. The couple's wedding was held on September 1, 2018. They have a son, Daxon Wardell-Xavier Lee, born on November 26, 2021.

References

External links

 Drexel Dragons bio
 Louisville Cardinals bio

1992 births
Living people
21st-century African-American sportspeople
African-American basketball players
American men's basketball players
Atlanta Hawks players
Basketball players from Baltimore
Calvert Hall College High School alumni
Curry family
Drexel Dragons men's basketball players
Golden State Warriors players
Louisville Cardinals men's basketball players
Maine Red Claws players
Phoenix Suns players
Santa Cruz Warriors players
Shooting guards
Small forwards
Undrafted National Basketball Association players
United States men's national basketball team players